The discography of Arthur Loves Plastic, the performing name of electronic music artist Bev Stanton, consists of twenty one studio albums, two compilation albums, one soundtrack and five extended plays. Arthur Loves Plastic was formed in 1994 in Washington, D.C. and Stanton is also acknowledged as a "remix master", as well as performing as a Beltway club DJ.

Arthur Loves Plastic's debut was the extended play Sperm Warfare which was released on the British T.E.Q. Music? label in March 1995. Following the collapse of the label, Stanton has released most of her music on her own Machine Heart Music label. Arthur Loves Plastic's latest is the album  Strings which was released in February 2013.

Studio recordings

Studio albums

Compilation albums

Soundtrack albums

Extended plays

Remixes by Arthur Loves Plastic 
Remixes of other artists tracks by Arthur Loves Plastic.

Compilation albums

Extended plays

Remixes of Arthur Loves Plastic 
Remixes of Arthur Loves Plastic tracks by other artists.

Albums

Extended plays

Appearances on compilation albums 
Compilation albums that include tracks by Arthur Loves Plastic.

References

Discographies of American artists
Electronic music discographies